The City of Nedlands is a local government area in the inner western suburbs of the Western Australian capital city of Perth, about  west of Perth's central business district. The City is situated within the western suburbs of the metropolitan area—known colloquially as the “golden triangle” for the concentration of wealth and high housing values.

History
The City of Nedlands originated in the Claremont Road District, which was established on 30 March 1893 after a petition from ratepayers who lived in the areas of Nedlands and Claremont, which had grown substantially in population at the end of the 19th century. Seven men were nominated to the new Board, which became the first local government authority for the Nedlands/Claremont area.

In 1898, Claremont itself split away to form a municipal government, which still exists today as the Town of Claremont.

It was renamed the Nedlands Road District on 12 August 1932 and given municipal status as the Municipality of Nedlands on 17 February 1956. It then assumed its current name when it was granted city status on 1 July 1959. The City was made up of four wards – Melvista, Hollywood, Dalkeith and Coastal. These wards continue to the present day.

Following an unsuccessful effort to amalgamate metropolitan local governments in 2016, the state government expanded the boundary of the City of Perth to incorporate a portion of the City of Nedlands that included the University of Western Australia and surrounding residential areas.

Following the change of government in the 2017 state election, the City of Nedlands experienced sustained political pressure to accommodate infill development and higher residential densities. The failure of Council to cooperate in replacing the City’s 30-year old planning scheme led to the imposition of a new planning scheme by the Minister of Planning. A subsequent spate of development applications led to significant community unrest and opposition and contributed to the resignations of key executive staff (including the chief executive officer and director of planning) and the mayor.

Wards
The town is divided into four wards, each electing three councillors. The mayor is directly elected.

 Coastal Ward
 Dalkeith Ward
 Hollywood Ward
 Melvista Ward

Mayor

The current mayor of the City of Nedlands, since July 2021, is Fiona Argyle.

Suburbs
The suburbs of the City of Nedlands with population and size figures based on the most recent Australian census:

* Shared with other council areas (Subiaco; Cambridge; Perth)

Population

Heritage listed places

As of 2023, there are 22 places on the State Register of Heritage Places in the City of Nedlands, among them the Captain Stirling Hotel and Graylands Hospital.

References

External links
 

 
Nedlands